Matt Arnold is an American baseball executive who is the general manager of the Milwaukee Brewers of Major League Baseball.

Career
Arnold graduated from Highland High School in Bakersfield, California, and the University of California, Santa Barbara. He worked for the Tampa Bay Rays until David Stearns hired Arnold for the Brewers in October 2015. Arnold was promoted to general manager in November 2020. On October 27, 2021, Arnold signed a contract extension with Milwaukee.

After the 2022 season, Stearns stepped down as president of baseball operations to take on an advisory role with the Brewers. The team placed Arnold in charge of baseball operations.

References

Living people
People from Bakersfield, California
University of California, Santa Barbara alumni
Milwaukee Brewers executives
Major League Baseball general managers
Year of birth missing (living people)
Tampa Bay Rays executives